Glenea iriei is a species of beetle in the family Cerambycidae. It was described by Masao Hayashi in 1971. It is known from Japan.

Subspecies
 Glenea iriei heikichii Makihara, 1982
 Glenea iriei iriei Hayashi, 1971

References

iriei
Beetles described in 1971